Beiguornis is a genus of bohaiornithid bird from the Early Cretaceous Longjiang Formation of Inner Mongolia, China. The genus contains a single species, Beiguornis khinganensis. Beiguornis is the first and only enantiornithine bird known from the Longjiang Formation. In the phylogenetic analysis conducted by the describing authors, Beiguornis formed a monophyletic group with the bohaiornithids Sulcavis and Zhouornis.

References 

Birds described in 2022
Fossil taxa described in 2022
Extinct birds of Asia
Early Cretaceous dinosaurs of Asia
Prehistoric bird genera
Enantiornitheans